Eudonia philerga is a species of moth of the family Crambidae. This species was first described by Edward Meyrick. It is endemic to New Zealand and is found throughout the country. E. philerga is regarded as being common. Larvae feed on moss and the adults have been observed on the wing more frequently from October to April. Adult moths are attracted to light.

Taxonomy 
This species was named Scoparia philerga by Edward Meyrick in 1884. Meyrick gave a detailed description of the adult moth in 1885. George Hudson discussed and illustrated this species his 1928 publication The butterflies and moths of New Zealand. In 1988 John S. Dugdale placed this species in the genus Eudonia. The male holotype specimen, collected at Lake Wakatipu, is held at the Natural History Museum, London.

Description

The larvae of E. philerga are about  inch long and are coloured a dull dark green with head that is reddish brown. They have large blackish green protuberances. This colouration provides excellent camouflage as, when still, larvae are difficult to see amongst their host plant. The pupa is formed amongst moss and is surrounded by a thin cocoon.  
Hudson described the adult of the species as follows:
 
Hudson noted that when at rest on trees or rocks, the colouration of the adult moth also provides excellent camouflage, safeguarding it from predators.

Distribution 
This species is endemic to New Zealand. It is found throughout the country and is regarded as being common.

Behaviour 
It has been hypothesised that this species has two broods and that adults of the autumn generation hibernate as adults have been taken by light trapping during winter.  Adults are on the wing through out the year though more frequently from October to April. The adults of this species are attracted to light.

Host species 
The larvae of this species feed on mosses found on wood.

Threats 
A specimen of this species has been tested for Wolbachia infection. However the result of this test was negative.

References

Eudonia
Moths of New Zealand
Moths described in 1884
Taxa named by Edward Meyrick
Endemic moths of New Zealand